The 2017 Cup of Nations was the fifth Cup of Nations rugby union tournament since its creation in 2011. The tournament returned to Hong Kong, reprising its name as the Hong Kong Cup of Nations. The tournament acted as a year-ending tournament for "up and coming" tier 3 teams from different continents, providing greater preparation for teams to play in their regional competitions, especially with the 2017 participants aiming to qualify for the 2019 Rugby World Cup or to make the Rugby World Cup global repechage in November 2018.

The four competing teams were the hosts Hong Kong, two-time defending champions Russia, Chile and Kenya.

Format
The tournament was played as a single round-robin, with the winner being the team with the most table points after the third round of fixtures.

Standings

Fixtures

Round 1

Round 2

Round 3

See also
 2017 end-of-year rugby union internationals

References

2017
2017 rugby union tournaments for national teams
International rugby union competitions hosted by Hong Kong
rugby union
2017 in Asian rugby union
2017 in Russian rugby union
rugby union
rugby union
November 2017 sports events in Asia